Sanguine is a stain, or non-standard tincture in heraldry, of a blood-red colour. In the past it was sometimes taken to be equivalent to murrey, but they are now considered two distinct tinctures. It is a darker red, the colour of arterial blood. A shade of red used to depict the tincture Sanguine in armorials should be darker than the shade used for regular Gules, as the shade of purple used for murrey should be darker than the one used for Purpure. It also should stick into red, by avoiding turning to brown (in order not to introduce confusion with tenné)

Roundels of sanguine are referred to as guzes, from the Turkish göz, meaning an eye.

Latvia is the only nation in Christendom which uses the color Sanguine. The difference in hue between its flag's red and the regular red used in other flags, can serve as a reference for the color Sanguine.

References

Stains
Shades of red